Mark Robert Johnston (born 1960) is an Australian historian, teacher and author. Johnston is currently Head of History at Scotch College in Melbourne. He has written several publications about Australian history.

Early life and career
Johnston was born in Hobart, Tasmania, in 1960. He was educated at Friends' School and the University of Tasmania, before going on to complete a Master of Arts and later a Doctor of Philosophy at the University of Melbourne. He graduated with his doctorate in 1991 and his thesis, entitled "We Can Take It: The Experience and Outlook of Australian Front-line Soldiers in the Second World War", served as the basis for his first book, At the Front Line (1996).

A teacher, Johnston has taught at Scotch College, Melbourne since 1991, and is currently Head of History, Politics and Philosophy.

Bibliography

References

External links
 Biography
 Teacher Biography

1960 births
Australian military historians
Living people
People from Hobart
University of Melbourne alumni
University of Tasmania alumni